The Rugby Europe Sevens are a series of rugby sevens tournaments held by Rugby Europe. It was formerly known as the FIRA-AER Sevens until 2013, and the Sevens Grand Prix Series until 2021. Only one annual tournament existed prior to 2011, when Rugby Europe created a series of tournaments, following the model of the World Rugby Sevens Series. The main division is known as the Rugby Europe Championship Series, formerly known the Grand Prix, followed by the Trophy Series, Conference 1, and Conference 2. The competitions use a promotion/relegation system.

Format 
In the Grand Prix, twelve teams play in several tournaments each summer throughout Europe. Each tournament spans two days — the first day is a pool phase and the second day is a knockout phase. During the pool phase, the teams are divided into three pools of four teams each. After the pool phase, the top eight teams (two first of each pool, plus two best-performing third place teams) advance to the Cup tournament; the other four teams play for the Challenge Trophy.

At the end of each tournament, teams are awarded points based on their performance. At the end of the series, the team with the most points is declared the champion. The team with the fewest points is relegated from the Grand Prix to the Trophy competition, whereas the champion of the Trophy competition is promoted to next season's Grand Prix.

History

2002–2010
A number of qualifying tournaments lead up to a finals tournament, which functions as the European championship and, in 2008, also as the qualifying stage for the Sevens World Cup.

The first European Championship was held in 2002 in Heidelberg, Germany, and was won by Portugal, the team that won every men's championship since except 2007 and 2009, when Russia won. In 2003, the tournament was again held in Heidelberg and, in 2004, Palma de Mallorca, Spain was the host. From 2005 to 2007, Moscow was the host of the tournament.

Hanover held the tournament for the first time in 2008 and did so again in 2009. In 2010, the tournament return to Moscow.

Since 2011
In 2011, the format of the competition changed. The twelve best teams meet on several tournaments, following the model of the IRB Sevens World Series. The name also changed, the European Championship was known as Sevens Grand Prix Series. The first edition of this competition was held in 2011 and won by Portugal.

Tournaments

Championship Series

Team Records 

Updated to 2022

Trophy

Conference

Conference 1

Conference 2

Partners
 Société Générale, Eurosport 2 (official broadcaster), Berugbe

References

External links 
 
 Rugby7.com: About the European Grand Prix Series

 
Rugby sevens competitions in Europe
Rugby Europe tournaments
2002 establishments in Europe
Recurring sporting events established in 2002